The Gabala FC 2007–08 season was Gabala FC's second Azerbaijan Premier League season, and their second season under manager Ramiz Mammadov. They finished the season in 6th place, whilst they also took part in the 2007–08 Azerbaijan Cup, which they were knocked out of in the Semifinals by Khazar Lankaran.

Squad

Transfers

Summer

In:

 
 

 
 
 
 
 
 
 
 
 

Out:

Winter

In:

Out:

Competitions

Azerbaijan Premier League

Results summary

Results by round

Results

Table

Azerbaijan Cup

Squad statistics

Appearances and goals

|-
|colspan="14"|Players who appeared for Gabala no longer at the club:
|}

Goal scorers

Team kit
These are the 2007–08 Gabala F.C. kits.

Notes
Qarabağ have played their home games at the Tofiq Bahramov Stadium since 1993 due to the ongoing situation in Quzanlı.

References

External links 
Gabala FC Website
Gabala FC at UEFA.com

Gabala FC seasons
Gabala